Shout in the Rainbow!! (stylized in Japan as Shout In The Rainbow!!) is the third video album released by Japanese rock act Superfly. The performances come from the final Osaka-jō Hall concert part of Superfly's late 2011 arena tour of the same name. The limited editions will include a bonus CD with a previously unreleased track. It is scheduled for release on April 4, 2012.

The Shout in the Rainbow!! Blu-ray release reached the number 1 spot of the Oricon Weekly Blu-ray charts for the week of its release, selling 8048 copies, while only reaching number 3 on the general DVD and music DVD charts after selling 13 thousand units. Since the Blu-ray chart's inception in July 2008, Superfly is only the fourth solo artist to ever top it.

Track listing
The DVD edition is split into two discs, with disc 1 ending with "I Remember".

The iTunes Store released a five-track audio EP of selected performances from the video album.

References

2012 live albums
Superfly (band) albums
Live albums by Japanese artists
2012 video albums
Live video albums